This is a list of banks in Afghanistan.

Central bank 
 Da Afghanistan Bank

State Owned Banks 

 Bank Millie Afghan
 Pashtany Bank
 New Kabul Bank

Local banks 
 Islamic Bank of Afghanistan
 Afghanistan International Bank
 Azizi Bank
 Maiwand Bank
 Bank-e-Millie Afghan
 First MicroFinance Bank-Afghanistan
 Ghazanfar bank
 Afghan United Bank

Branches Of Foreign Banks 
 National Bank of Pakistan
 Bank Alfalah ltd

References

Afghanistan
Banks
Banks

Afghanistan